Chamba language may refer to:
 Akaselem language of Togo
 Chamba Daka or Chamba Leko of Nigeria and Cameroon
 two languages of Chamba, India:
the Sino-Tibetan Pattani language
the Indo-Aryan Chambeali language